Tony Morrin (31 July 1946 - 14 December 2020) was an English footballer who played as a midfielder.

References

1946 births
2020 deaths
English footballers
Association football defenders
Rochdale A.F.C. players
English Football League players
Stockport County F.C. players